Zora Singh (June 15, 1928 -  October 9, 2005) was an Indian athlete. He represented India in the 1960 Rome Olympic games and got 8th position in the 50km walk event.

References 

Athletes (track and field) at the 1960 Summer Olympics
Indian male racewalkers
Olympic athletes of India
1939 births
2005 deaths
Place of birth missing